Samanabador block 18 of F.B Area, is one of the neighborhoods of Gulberg Town in Karachi, Sindh, Pakistan.

There are several ethnic groups in Samanabad including Muhajirs as majority, Sindhis, Punjabis, Kashmiris, Seraikis, Pakhtuns, Balochis, etc. Over 99% of the population is Muslim. The population of Gulberg Town is estimated to be nearly one million

See also 
 Gulberg
 Aisha Manzil
 Ancholi
 Azizabad
 Karimabad
 Shafiq Mill Colony
 Water Pump
 Yaseenabad
 Musa Colony
 Dastagir Colony

References

External links 
 Karachi Website

Neighbourhoods of Karachi
Gulberg Town, Karachi
Karachi Central District